Haloplasma contractile is a halophilic, cell wall-less bacterium. It is the only known representative of a deep lineage, and is classified in its own family (Haloplasmataceae) and order (Haloplasmatales), in the class Mollicutes.
In terms of genetics, the bacterium Haloplasma contractile contains a dcw gene cluster is responsible for containing all the genes of the organism and promoting peptidoglycan synthesis. Also, MreB/Mbl are specific homologous parts of this bacterium that are vital in the contractility of the cell. In regards to its physical attributes, this organism consists of a spherical body with approximately two protrusions which alternate between straight and contracted forms.

References

3. Antunes, A., et al. “A New Lineage of Halophilic, Wall-Less, Contractile Bacteria from a Brine-Filled Deep of the Red Sea.” Journal of Bacteriology, vol. 190, no. 10, July 2008, pp. 3580–3587., doi:10.1128/jb.01860-07.

4. Antunes, A., et al. “Genome Sequence of Haloplasma Contractile, an Unusual Contractile Bacterium from a Deep-Sea Anoxic Brine Lake.” Journal of Bacteriology, vol. 193, no. 17, 2011, pp. 4551–4552., doi:10.1128/jb.05461-11.

External links
Type strain of Haloplasma contractile at BacDive -  the Bacterial Diversity Metadatabase

Mollicutes
Monotypic bacteria genera